Sly may refer to:

People
 Sly Stone (born 1943), American musician in Sly and the Family Stone
 Sylvester Stallone (born 1946), American actor
 Sly Bailey (born 1962), British businesswoman
 Sly Dunbar (born 1952), Jamaican drummer
 Sylvain Grenier (born 1977), Canadian wrestler
 Sly (surname)

Music
 Sly (opera), by Ermanno Wolf-Ferrari
 "Sly" (The Cat Empire song)
 "Sly" (Massive Attack song)
 Sly (band), a Japanese heavy metal band

Gaming
 Sly Cooper (character) in the Sly Cooper series, including:
 Sly Cooper and the Thievius Raccoonus
 Sly 2: Band of Thieves
 Sly 3: Honor Among Thieves
 Sly Cooper: Thieves in Time

Other
 sly, ISO 639-3 code for the Selayar language, Indonesia
 Sly syndrome, a genetic disease